Curtis Hertel Jr. (born January 9, 1978) is an American politician who served as a state senator from 2015 to 2022, for the 23rd district in Michigan, which represented the cities of Lansing and East Lansing, as well as the townships of Alaiedon Township, Michigan, Aurelius, Bunker Hill, Delhi, Ingham, Lansing, Leslie, Meridian, Onondaga, Vevay, Stockbridge, and White Oak. He was elected Ingham County Register of Deeds in 2008, and re-elected to a second term in 2012, followed by his election to the State Senate in 2014.  He is the son of Curtis Hertel, who was co-speaker of the Michigan House of Representatives from 1993 to 1994. Hertel's brother, Kevin Hertel, was elected to the State House of Representatives in November 2016

Education and early career
Hertel holds a bachelor's degree from James Madison College at Michigan State University. Hertel served on the Ingham County Board of Commissioners from 2001 to 2008. From 2005 to 2008, Hertel worked as a Legislative Liaison for the Department of Community Health under Governor Jennifer Granholm.

Political career
Hertel was elected Ingham County Register of deeds in 2008. As Register of Deeds, Hertel filed a lawsuit against mortgage firms Fannie Mae and Freddie Mac in 2011, seeking millions in unpaid taxes on property transfers in the county. The outcome is still pending.

Hertel was elected to the Michigan State Senate in 2014. He began his first in month by introducing bills to offer tax credits to Michigan college graduates who elected to remain residents of the state after graduation. He also introduced legislation aimed at reducing sexual assault on college campuses by requiring discussions on affirmative consent in high school sex education classes.

Later in 2015, Hertel introduced a bill aimed at increasing the rate of successful organ transplants by expanding the number of sites that could obtain human organs. It was signed into law on April 5, 2016.

He also introduced a bill in 2015 to prevent non-governmental organizations and individuals from charging unnecessary fees for copies of deeds being requested from property owners. It was signed into law on April 12, 2016.

In March 2016, he sponsored a bill to fund Michigan's First Responder Presumed Coverage Fund, which provides medical assistance for firefighters who get cancer from the various chemicals they're exposed to on the job. He also introduced a bill in October 2016 to expand the coverage of the fund to include breast cancer.

Due to term limits, Senator Hertel was ineligible for re-election in 2022.

References

External links
 Official Senate Profile
 Campaign website

1978 births
21st-century American politicians
County commissioners in Michigan
Democratic Party Michigan state senators
Living people
Michigan State University alumni
People from Ingham County, Michigan
Politicians from Detroit